United Borneo Alliance (abbreviated UBA), was formed by Jeffrey Kitingan in 2012 after he launched the Sabah chapter of Sarawak-based State Reform Party (STAR). Jeffrey also had earlier set-up the preceding United Borneo Front (UBF), the formation of an alliance comprising the State Reform Party (STAR), United Sabah National Organisation (USNO), Sabah Progressive Party (SAPP) and Sarawak National Party (SNAP) (In 2022, the three parties have officially joined together in the GRS Coalition, while the Sarawak National Party (SNAP) was dissolved on 17 January 2013). The Borneo-based parties from Sabah and Sarawak which would be promoting of the "One country, two systems" just like the Hong Kong and Macau status in China which similarly was an initiative with the platform to educate the people to make a change in themselves first and ultimately to bring Sabahan and Sarawakian to better quality of life and a more progressive country.

In 2015, Jeffrey had merged the UBA into the new United Sabah Alliance (USA) he had formed and finally merged the UBA into Gabungan Rakyat Sabah in September 2020. The year 2020 for Sabah Progressive Party (SAPP) and Homeland Solidarity Party (STAR) to merged into Gabungan Rakyat Sabah and March 2022 for United Sabah National Organisation (USNO) to merged into Gabungan Rakyat Sabah. just before he re-registered the State Reform Party's Sabah chapter he had led to establish it as a new Sabah-based party, the Parti Solidariti Tanah Airku (STAR) but retained the backronym  'STAR' , leaving the original STAR back to a Sarawak party again in 2016.

See also
 List of political parties in Malaysia
 Politics of Malaysia
 Jeffrey Kitingan
 State Reform Party
 United Sabah Alliance

References

2012 establishments in Malaysia
2015 disestablishments in Malaysia
Political parties established in 2012
Political parties disestablished in 2015
Defunct political party alliances in Malaysia